Gerda Olsen (born 12 June 1932) is a Danish former swimmer. She competed in the women's 400 metre freestyle at the 1952 Summer Olympics.

References

1932 births
Living people
Danish female swimmers
Olympic swimmers of Denmark
Swimmers at the 1952 Summer Olympics
Swimmers from Copenhagen